Banco Fondo Común (Banco Fondo Común CA, BFC) is a bank in Venezuela. It is based in the city of Caracas, and has 165 banking agencies across the country. Customers can use the BFC Mobile App to access their account information.

References

External links
 

Banks of Venezuela
Banks established in 1963
Venezuelan companies established in 1963